The Edwin Mellen Press is an academic publisher with editorial offices in Lewiston, New York, and Lampeter, Wales. It was founded in 1972 by theology professor Herbert W. Richardson.

The press is a "non-subsidy academic publisher of books in the humanities and social sciences" releasing "Monographs, critical editions, collections, translations, revisionist studies, constructive essays, bibliographies, dictionaries, reference guides and dissertations". Most of its published works are in English but not all. It has been involved in a number of notable legal and academic controversies.

History
Following its founding in 1972, the publishing house was initially meant to publish specialized scholarship produced in Richardson's department at the University of St Michael's College, Early publications included bibliographies, translations, and dissertations completed by faculty and doctoral students at the University of Toronto. The house was named after Richardson's grandfather, Edwin Mellen, whom he describes as a lover of books. As was Edwin Mellen University, a private university located on Grand Turk, Turks and Caicos Islands operated by Richardson since 1992.

Under Richardson's leadership the publishing house grew steadily and began publishing works by various scholars external to the University of Toronto, widening its served topics to the broader humanities and social sciences. By 1979 it moved to new locations in the towns of Lewiston, New York and Queenston, Canada. Its office in Lampeter, Wales opened in 1987. By 1990 it was publishing up to 150 titles a year. Following Richardson's professional parting with St Michael's College following a gross misconduct investigation and a dismissal in October of 1994 he began focussing more attention towards his publishing business raising the number works published a year to 350.

Scholarly publishing 
The Mellen Press describes its ethos when selecting works to publish as valuing "scholar-for-scholar research more than anything", stating "the sole criterion for publication is that the manuscript must make a contribution to scholarship". Its publications are peer-reviewed. Research libraries constitute its primary customer base. It often publishes research on less popular topics.

Its Adèle Mellen Prize is awarded to an author for a book which, in the considered judgment of the press’ peer-reviewers, is deemed to make a "distinguished contribution to scholarship".

Reception
The Edwin Mellen Press has been described by some critics as a vanity press. Contrary to this assertion the publisher stresses it is a "non-subsidy academic publisher" and does not accept payments from authors for purposes of publishing their work. According to Miles it "accepts no author subsidies, but also pays no royalties" and expects authors to provide "error free, camera-ready copy" by themselves. It has been often taken legal action against critics repeating the claim of it being a vanity press. Some critics claim that this has further damaged its reputation. 

The publisher's litigiousness began in 1993, when its former employee Robert West contacted the American academic magazine Lingua Franca. He urged the magazine to publish an exposé and described the publishing house's founder, Richardson, as a "rogue professor" operating a "vanity press". Lingua Franca published an article by Warren St John as the cover story of its September/October 1993 issue. The article described the publishing house as a "quasi-vanity press cunningly disguised as an academic publishing house" and, in particular, ridiculed a book it had published by Joseph R. Washington, Jr. In response, the publisher sued West and Lingua Franca for libel. The 1994 case against West was settled by West's letter of regret to Richardson for "the difficulties he had with Lingua Franca magazine and the University of Toronto". In it he stated "I do not believe Herbert Richardson to be a 'rogue professor' nor do I believe that the Edwin Mellen Press was organized to be a vanity operation". However, in 1996, the publisher lost its lawsuit against Lingua Franca on grounds that the article in dispute was "supported by an honest assessment of the facts at hand when the article was published".

In 1998, the press sued Oxford University Press concerning a review in one of its publications (the Journal of Theological Studies) which claimed the Edwin Mellen Press to be a vanity press. In a subsequent issue of the journal, Oxford University Press retracted the offending statements, apologized, and published a new review.

In 2009, the press was successful in suing the academic Thom Brooks for blog postings found by the court to be defamatory. One of these was titled "More reasons to avoid Edwin Mellen Press". Brooks was required to pay financial damages and offered his "sincere apologies" to the Press saying he accepts "without reservation that Mellen does not charge authors anything to have their works published" and "now accepts that there was no truth in any of those allegations and that the criticisms he made...were unjustified".

In 2012, the press pursued lawsuits against McMaster University and one of its librarians, Dale Askey. He had criticized Mellen Press on a blog post, which had been deleted prior to the publisher filing suit. The Canadian Association of University Teachers and others condemned the press for what they called SLAPP lawsuits intended to curtail academic freedom. Martha Reineke started a petition demanding that the press drop the suits. It garnered 2,691 signatures. According to coverage of this event in the Chronicle of Higher Education, more than 30 scholarly organizations condemned the press. Which in turn maintained that its good reputation was at stake and had prompted the suit. In February 2015, the last of the lawsuits was settled out of court. Askey said, "The outcome of this case is essentially a neutral outcome for academic freedom. Both parties walk away from the matter admitting nothing and resolving nothing". 

In 2013, the Press threatened legal action against the Society for Scholarly Publishing for publishing blog posts containing what it characterized as "disparaging comments" and for allowing "libelous statements" to be posted in the reader comments section on The Scholarly Kitchen. These posts were first removed and then restored in their entirety; but a reader comment which Mellen Press had found objectionable was removed.

Selected published works 
Mellen authors have included Marcus Borg, Francis J. Beckwith, Dan Cohn-Sherbok, Don H. Compier, David Craven, Richard Coates, Arthur J. Dewey, Herman Dooyeweerd, Nancy McCampbell Grace, Lisa Kahn, José Manuel Losada, Niklas Luhmann, M. Mukundan, David A. Rausch, Thomas P. Riccio, Hugh R. Page, Vladimir Shlapentokh, Ann Snodgrass, Albert Spaulding Cook, Frederick Stocken, Alan Mauritz Swanson, H. Micheal Tarver, Jean-François Thiriart, Huon Wardle, and Sherifa Zuhur, among others.

.
.
.
.
.
.
.
.
.
.

Footnotes

References

External links

Academic publishing companies
Publishing companies established in 1972
Book publishing companies of the United States
Publishing companies of the United States
Publishing companies of the United Kingdom
Printing companies of the United States
Printing companies of the United Kingdom
Book publishing companies of the United Kingdom
Book publishing companies based in New York (state)
Companies based in New York (state)
Publishing companies established in the 1970s
Organizations established in 1972
Reference publishers